The Vengeance Trilogy is a South Korean thematically-linked film trilogy directed by Park Chan-wook, comprising Sympathy for Mr. Vengeance (2002), Oldboy (2003) and Lady Vengeance (2005). Each film deals with the themes of revenge, ethics, violence and salvation. The films are not narratively connected and were dubbed a trilogy by international critics due to their thematic links. The trilogy is considered a revision of the European revenge tradition set amid the 21st century globalization traumas in South Korea.

Films

Sympathy for Mr. Vengeance (2002)
The first installment in Park's trilogy was the 2002 film, Sympathy for Mr. Vengeance, a bleak and violent tale of revenge gone wrong. It tells the story of a deaf-mute man who kidnaps a young girl to pay for his sister's much-needed kidney transplant. When the young girl accidentally dies, her bereaved father goes on a search for answers and vengeance. The film did relatively poorly at the box office in South Korea finishing 30th in ticket rank. It covered less than half its production costs in both domestic and international box office gates, where in the U.S. it garnered gross revenues of $45,243.

Oldboy (2003)
Park's next film in the trilogy was the hugely successful 2003 film, Oldboy. It told the story of a man who is imprisoned for fifteen years and then released with no explanation as to why he was confined and released. Now, he has been given five days to learn his captor's true identity and find out why he was imprisoned, or his new love interest will be killed. The film was very well received at film festivals and at the box office in South Korea. It won the Grand Prix award at the 2004 Cannes Film Festival and received positive reviews from critics. The film has gained a cult following in the years following its release and is considered a modern classic.

A remake was directed by Spike Lee in 2013.

Lady Vengeance (2005)
The third and final installment in the trilogy was the 2005 film, Lady Vengeance. The film tells the tale of an innocent young woman released from prison after doing time for a child-killer still at large. Once freed, she seeks out her long-lost daughter and unveils her plan for revenge against the ghastly man for whom she served time. This film was also well received by critics and South Korean audiences alike. It grossed $7,382,034 in its opening week and competed for the Golden Lion at the 62nd Venice International Film Festival in September 2005.

Recurring cast members

Analysis 
Kim Se Young explained the Trilogy's violence as "an allegorical tool which serves to convey social commentary pointed at the processes of democratization and capitalism in South Korea".

Reception

Home media
In the United Kingdom, Tartan Films issued a box set on DVD. In the United States, Vivendi Entertainment released the same set.

References

External links
 Movie Review: The Vengeance Trilogy at Eye for Film
 Movie Review: The Vengeance Trilogy at OneKnightStands.net
 Movie Review: The Vengeance Trilogy at Culturazzi
 Movie Review: The Vengeance Trilogy at Neoimages 
 Cartoon about The Vengeance Trilogy at Maxmovie.com 

Action film series
South Korean film series
Films directed by Park Chan-wook
Trilogies
Film series introduced in 2002